Matt may refer to:

Matt (name), people with the given name Matt or Matthew, meaning "gift from God", or the surname Matt
In British English, of a surface: having a non-glossy finish, see gloss (material appearance)
Matt, Switzerland, a municipality
"Matt", the cartoon by Matthew Pritchett in the UK Telegraph newspapers

See also
 Maat (disambiguation)
 MAT (disambiguation)
 Mat (disambiguation)
 Matte (disambiguation)
 Matthew (name)
 Mutt (disambiguation)